Hampden was an electoral district of the Legislative Assembly in the Australian state of Victoria from 1904 until its abolition in 1976. Most of the territory located in the old division of Hampden was transferred into the re-created electorate of Ripon. Hampden's most notable member was the longest serving Premier of Victoria Sir Henry Bolte. The seat was a marginally conservative seat, having never been won by the non-conservative parties for more than one term.

Members for Hampden

Election results

References 
 Former members search, Parliament of Victoria
 = "Liberal and Country Party" was the name of the Victorian branch of the Liberal Party of Australia  from 1949 until 1965

Former electoral districts of Victoria (Australia)
1976 disestablishments in Australia
1904 establishments in Australia